War of the Worlds: Goliath is a 2012 Malaysian animated science fiction war film directed by Joe Pearson that was released in 15 November 2012 in Malaysia. The film is voiced by actors Peter Wingfield, Adrian Paul, Tony Eusoff, Elizabeth Gracen, Jim Byrnes, Rob Middleton, Mark Sheppard, Matt Letscher, Adam Baldwin and other voice actors. The film is a loose sequel to H. G. Wells' 1898 novel The War of the Worlds. Its title refers to the human tripod the main characters use in the film.

The film was produced by Tripod Group.

Plot
The film is set in an alternate reality Earth. In 1899, the Martians launched an unprovoked attack on the major nations of the world. In Leeds, England, ten-year-old Eric Wells watches in horror as a Martian Tripod lays waste to his city and then kills his parents. But before it can kill him, the Martian Tripod suddenly keels forward and crashes into the ground. Over 140 million people were killed by the Martians, and many of the great cities of the world were destroyed until the Martians were killed off by Earth's bacteria, against which the Martians had no defense.

Fifteen years later, in Manhattan, New York City in 1914, the world has seen radical change and development. It has become a dieselpunk/steampunk-like world, where Earth is at the potential onset of the Great War as the European nations' fragile alliance begins to shatter. A now twenty-five-year-old Eric Wells is Captain of a Tripod squad for the A.R.E.S. (Allied Resistance Earth Squadrons) organization, alongside American Lieutenant Jennifer Carter, Irish Corporal Patrick O'Brien, Canadian Sergeant Abraham Douglas, and Malayan Lieutenant Raja Iskandar Shah. A.R.E.S. is commanded by strict Russian General Sergei Kushnirov (who lost his family to the Martians in 1899 at St. Petersburg, leaving only his son Dimitri left), Secretary of War Theodore Roosevelt (who forsook a second term as President of the United States), and Professor Nikola Tesla, an enigmatic Serbian scientist who reverse-engineered the technology from the first, failed, invasion of the Martians and created A.R.E.S. weapons and vehicles.

Eric and his team receive the first of a new type of steam-powered, Achilles-class Battle Tripod, (65 feet tall, armed with heavy machine guns and six light rockets, a heat ray and an 88-millimeter cannon) who nicknames his new tripod 'The Goliath'. But as his crew are preparing to engage another group of Tripods in a simulated war game against Japanese Captain Sakai, the A.R.E.S. alliance is threatened by the onset of the Great War when Archduke Franz Ferdinand is assassinated in Sarajevo. The members of A.R.E.S. are all called back to their respective countries in preparation for the coming war, but Eric, outraged at the stupidity of the human politicians and leaders, convinces everyone to stay and prepare for the coming Martian invasion.

This proves to be advantageous, as a second, more ruthless, Martian invasion begins, using more advanced, 100 foot tall, heat ray spewing, tripod battle machines, and are now immune to Earth's bacteria. The Martians first attack the War Games, and decimate many of A.R.E.S.'s forces until they themselves are destroyed by Eric and his team. But, according to General Kurshnirov at the debrief, that was just a probing attack to judge A.R.E.S.' combat potential as the real invasion began.

The Martians landed on various countries and A.R.E.S. are deployed to repel the invasion. General Kurshnirov sets an ambush for some of the tripods and on knowing three Tripods had broke off, sends Eric's team to hunt the three Tripods. Eric and his team destroys two tripods with the aid of the militia, with only Eric's crew and Wilson, a member of the militia, surviving the encounter. Wilson leads Eric to a factory which the Martians are using as a base. They discover that the Martians are capturing and harvesting humans, and building weapons for the invasion. The prisoners are rescued and the factory then destroyed. The Leviathan, A.R.E.S.'s flying warship, then arrives to evacuate the team.

General Kurshnirov briefs Eric that the attacks were a feint to draw out A.R.E.S.'s forces out of New York and the Martians had attacked A.R.E.S.'s base in New York. New York is overrun with Roosevelt holding the A.R.E.S.'s base. The Martians breach the base and the Leviathan and Agemmon, A.R.E.S.'s other floating warship, arrive to relieve the siege and Roosevelt regains the base. Together, they destroy all the Martians in New York.

As they are celebrating their victory, a large Martian spacecraft emerges from the waters near Liberty Island in New York Harbor. The spacecraft attacks A.R.E.S.'s base with devastating effects with its heat rays. Leviathan and Agemmon concentrate their attacks on the Martian spacecraft which causes it to attack both warships. Agemmon is then destroyed in a heat ray attack. The Leviathan flies low to avoid the heat rays while trying to get closer to it. A destroyed building falls on the Leviathan's bridge and caused it to crash to the buildings on its side. The crash causes Dimitri to fall off the bridge but he manages to cling to the side of the warship. General Kurshnirov attempts to save his son but he lets go of General Kurshnirov's hands to allow General Kurshnirov to regain control of the Leviathan. He calls out to General Kurshnirov "I love you, Father" as he falls to his death. General Kurshnirov regains control of the Leviathan and steer the warship in a collision course with the Martian spacecraft. They collide together and are destroyed, ending the invasion.

Roosevelt rallies the survivors to rebuild Earth and bring the war to Mars.

Novelization
Retro Rocket Press, an imprint of digital publisher KHP Publishers, Inc., published an official novelization by science fiction author Adam J. Whitlatch on 28 October 2014. The novel was taken out of print with the closing of KHP in late 2015.

The novelization was republished by Latchkey Press on 31 July 2018, marking the novel’s first publication in paperback.

External links
 
 
 

2012 films
2010s war films
2012 animated films
Malaysian animated films
Steampunk films
Dieselpunk films
Malaysian alternative history films
Films set in 1914
Films set in 1899
Films set in New York City
Films set in Manhattan
Malaysian war films
Mecha films
Films based on The War of the Worlds
Cultural depictions of Theodore Roosevelt
Cultural depictions of Manfred von Richthofen
Works about Nikola Tesla
Films set in Leeds
Films set in England
Films about extraterrestrial life
Alien invasions in films
2010s English-language films